John Fee may refer to:
 John Fee (politician)
 John Fee (luger)
 John Gregg Fee, American abolitionist